Bosnia and Herzegovina competed at the 2019 World Championships in Athletics in Doha, Qatar, from 27 September to 6 October 2019. Bosnia and Herzegovina were represented by 3 athletes.

Medalists

Results

Men 

 Track and road events

Field events

References 

Nations at the 2019 World Athletics Championships
2019 in Bosnia and Herzegovina sport
2019